The voiceless velar plosive or stop is a type of consonantal sound used in almost all spoken languages.

The  sound is a very common sound cross-linguistically. Most languages have at least a plain , and some distinguish more than one variety. Most Indo-Aryan languages, such as Hindi and Bengali, have a two-way contrast between aspirated and plain . Only a few languages lack a voiceless velar plosive, e.g. Tahitian and Mongolian.

Some languages have the voiceless pre-velar plosive, which is articulated slightly more front compared with the place of articulation of the prototypical velar plosive, though not as front as the prototypical palatal plosive.

Conversely, some languages have the voiceless post-velar plosive, which is articulated slightly behind the place of articulation of the prototypical velar plosive, though not as back as the prototypical uvular plosive.

Features

Features of the voiceless velar stop:

Varieties

Occurrence

See also
Hard and soft C
Index of phonetics articles

Notes

References

External links
 

Velar consonants
Voiceless stops
Pulmonic consonants
Central consonants